Laura Niles is an American model, actress, comedian, martial artist, and boxer.

Career

Acting
Niles acting career started in 2004 with appearances on The Best Damn Sports Show Period as "Santa's Helper". Since then she has appeared in a variety of minor roles, guest appearances, and walk-on roles that include the television series' Gun X Sword (2005), Perfect 10 Model Boxing (2006), Gay, Straight or Taken? (2007, two episodes), Showtime's Californication, and the pilot episode for The Defenders.

Niles has also appeared in several movies such as Dire Wolf (2009), Cheerleader Massacre 2 (2011), and the Twilight parody film Twiharder (2013).

Modeling
Niles has been featured in numerous men's magazines such a Maxim (Germany, UK & US editions), Esquire (Turkey), FHM (UK), Complex, Tandem, and Hot Dog. She was also featured in the 2005 FastDates.com calendar with Playboy Cybergirl Michelle LaVoie. Niles was the cover model for the January/February Germany edition of Maxim.

Appearances
Niles was a member of LA Temptation team in the 2006 Lingerie Bowl.

Personal life
Laura Niles was born in Los Angeles.  Her ethnic lineage is Russian, British, and Native American (Nez Perce). She received her BA in international relations (magna cum laude), with a minor in Mandarin Chinese, from the University of Southern California.

Filmography (partial)
 Californication, 2007
 Lingerie Bowl, 2006
 The Best Damn Sports Show Period, 2004

References

External links
 
 
 
 Laura Niles in Maxim UK

Living people
Actresses from Los Angeles
USC School of International Relations alumni
1978 births
21st-century American women